Abukar Arman is a Somali political analyst, writer and former Special Envoy to the United States. Arman is also a widely published foreign policy specialist, writing extensively on Somalia and international political affairs.

References

External links
Eurasia Review – Abukar Arman

Living people
Ethnic Somali people
Somalian diplomats
Somalian writers
Somalian emigrants to the United States
Year of birth missing (living people)